This is a list of public art in East Ayrshire, one of the 32 local government council areas of Scotland. The area borders Dumfries and Galloway, East Renfrewshire, North Ayrshire, South Ayrshire and South Lanarkshire. This list applies only to works of public art on permanent display in an outdoor public space and does not, for example, include artworks in museums.

Benquhat

Cumnock

Darvel

Dunlop

Kilmarnock

Kilmaurs

Mauchline

Muirkirk

New Cumnock

Newmilns

Stewarton

References

East Ayrshire
Public art
Outdoor sculptures in Scotland
Statues in Scotland